Snatchwood Halt railway station served Snatchwood between Pontypool and Abersychan in Torfaen, South Wales, UK. The station was opened by the Great Western Railway in 1912 on the line it had purchased from the Monmouthshire Railway and Canal Company in 1880. The Halt lay between Pontypool Crane Street to the south and Abersychan to the north. The Halt (and the line) lay adjacent to the current A4043 road, between the road and the nearby Afon Lwyd.

History
The Great Western Railway's Eastern Valley "Lower Line" ran from Newport to Blaenavon along the valley floor. By 1 June 1854 the double line was extended from Pontypool Crane Street to Abersychan. The rest of the line from Abersychan to Blaenavon remained single track. The line to Blaenavon was opened for passenger traffic on 1 October 1854. Stations were initially provided at Pontnewynydd, Abersychan, Cwmavon and Blaenavon. Three trains per day were run, taking one hour to complete the journey.

The "Lower" line had an hourly service and called at Pontnewynydd, Snatchwood Halt, Abersychan Low Level, Cwmffrwd Halt, Cwmavon Halt and Blaenavon Low Level and closed to passengers in 1962. The lower line track was lifted from Blaenavon to Trevethin Junction shortly afterward. However, the line "Upper" line continued to be used until 1980 for the considerable coal traffic from The Big Pit until its closure and a number of passenger specials were organised by rail enthusiasts between 1967 - 1980.

Notes

References

Disused railway stations in Torfaen
Railway stations in Great Britain opened in 1912
Railway stations in Great Britain closed in 1953
Former Great Western Railway stations